Quarr Hill is a small suburb of the town of Ryde, on the Isle of Wight.
sea level. Its population is included in the count of Ryde.

References 

Ryde